Heart in Motion is the ninth studio album by Christian singer-songwriter, Amy Grant, released on March 5, 1991. Unlike Grant's previous albums, Heart In Motion contains pop songs mingled with Christian values (with the exception of "Hope Set High" and "Ask Me". The album features Grant's biggest worldwide hit, "Baby Baby" and was certified 5× platinum in the United States, selling over five million copies.

Commercial success 

Heart in Motion peaked at No. 10 on the Billboard 200 and No. 1 of the Christian albums chart for 32 weeks. It sold five million copies by the end of 1997. The first single from the album, "Baby Baby" offers the lyric that provides the album title and reached No. 1 on the Billboard Hot 100 and the Hot Adult Contemporary Tracks charts. The following four singles also performed well on the pop and AC charts: "Every Heartbeat" (No. 2 Hot 100, No. 2 AC), "That's What Love Is For" (No. 7 Hot 100, No. 1 AC), "Good for Me" (No. 8 Hot 100, No. 4 AC), and "I Will Remember You" (No. 20 Hot 100, No. 2 AC). The album was listed at No. 30 in the 2001 book, The 100 Greatest Albums in Christian Music and was certified 5× platinum by the RIAA for sales of over five million copies, making it the best-selling Christian music album ever released.

The album also received a nomination at the Grammy Awards of 1992 for Album of the Year, which was awarded to Unforgettable... with Love by Natalie Cole. The lead single received three nominations, including Song of the Year and Record of the Year.

A 30th-anniversary remaster of the album, including a second disc of demos, outtakes, and remixes, was released by Amy Grant Productions, with distribution by Capitol Christian Music Group, on July 9, 2021.

Track listing

Personnel 

 Amy Grant – lead vocals, backing vocals (3, 6, 7, 8, 10)
 Keith Thomas – arrangements (1, 2), synthesizers (1, 2), bass (1, 2),  drum programming (1, 2), percussion programming (1), backing vocals (1)
 Brian Tankersley – additional synthesizer programming (1, 2)
 Robbie Buchanan – additional keyboards (3), keyboards (7, 10), bass (7), drum programming (10)
 Blair Masters – additional keyboards (3), keyboards (7)
 Charlie Peacock – keyboards (3, 7, 8, 10), programming (3), horn arrangements (3, 8), drum programming (10)
 Michael Omartian – keyboards (4–7, 9, 11), drum sequencing (5, 6, 9, 11), backing vocals (5, 6, 11)
 Jerry McPherson – guitars (1, 2, 3)
 Donald Kirkpatrick – guitars (4, 5, 6, 9)
 Dann Huff – guitars (7)
 Gordon Kennedy – guitars (7)
 Tom Hemby – guitars (10)
 Tommy Sims – bass (3, 7, 8)
 Mark Hammond – drum and percussion programming (1)
 Chris McHugh – drums (3, 7, 8)
 David Raven – drums (4)
 Chris McDonald – horn arrangements (3, 8)
 Mark Douthit – saxophone (3, 8)
 Sam Levine – baritone saxophone (8)
 Barry Green – trombone (3, 8)
 Mike Haynes – trumpet (3, 8)
 Ron Hemby – backing vocals (1, 2)
 Donna McElroy – backing vocals (1, 2)
 Vicki Hampton – backing vocals (2, 3)
 Chris Eaton – backing vocals (3, 7, 8)
 Kim Fleming – backing vocals (3)
 Gary Chapman – backing vocals (4)
 Diana DeWitt – backing vocals (4)
 Susanne Schwartz – backing vocals (6, 11)
 Chris Rodriguez – backing vocals (7, 8), guitar (8)
 Kurt Howell – backing vocals (11)

Production

 Michael Blanton – executive producer
 Amy Grant – executive producer
 Todd Moore – production assistant (1, 2), assistant engineer (1, 2)
 Traci Sterling – production coordinator  (3, 7, 8, 10)
 Richard Headen – production coordinator (3, 7, 8, 10)
 Janet Hinde – production coordinator (4, 5, 6, 9, 11)
 Bill Whittington – recording engineer (1, 2)
 Todd Culross – assistant engineer (1, 2)
 Kelly Pribble – assistant engineer (1, 2)
 Jeff Balding – audio engineer (3, 7, 8, 10), mixing (3, 8, 10)
 Bob Loftus – assistant audio engineer (3, 7, 8, 10) 
 Bill Deaton – overdub engineering (3, 7, 8, 10)
 Steve Bishir – overdub engineering (3, 7, 8, 10)
 Rick Will – overdub engineering (7)
 Terry Christian – audio engineer (4, 5, 6, 9, 11), overdub engineering (7), mixing (4, 5, 6, 9, 11)
 Clark Germain – overdub engineering  (10)
 David Ahlert – additional engineering (4, 5, 6, 9, 11)
 Laura Livingston – additional engineering (4, 5, 6, 9, 11)
 Clif Norrell – mix assistant (3, 8, 10)
 Oceanway Studios, Hollywood, California – mixing location (3, 8, 10)
 Brian Malouf – mixing (1, 2, 7)
 Pat MacDougal – mix assistant (1, 2, 7)
 Can-Am Studios, Tarzana, California – mixing location (1, 2, 7)
 Lighthouse, North Hollywood, California – mixing location (4, 5, 6, 9, 11)
 Stephen Marcussen – mastering
 Precision Mastering, Hollywood, California – mastering location
 Chuck Beeson – art direction
 Rowan Moore – design
 Victoria Pearson-Cameron – photography

Chart positions

Weekly charts

Year-end charts

Decade-end charts

Certifications and sales

See also
 List of best-selling albums in the United States

References

External links
 Heart In Motion: 20 Years (1991-2011) at chonnie.com

1991 albums
Amy Grant albums
Albums produced by Michael Omartian
Albums produced by Brown Bannister
A&M Records albums